The 2022 Al Habtoor Tennis Challenge was a professional tennis tournament played on outdoor hard courts. It was the twenty-fifth edition of the tournament which was part of the 2022 ITF Women's World Tennis Tour. It took place in Dubai, United Arab Emirates between 5 and 11 December 2022.

Champions

Singles

  Elsa Jacquemot def.  Magdalena Fręch, 7–5, 6–2

Doubles

  Tímea Babos /  Kristina Mladenovic def.  Magdalena Fręch /  Kateryna Volodko, 6–1, 6–3

Singles main draw entrants

Seeds

 1 Rankings are as of 28 November 2022.

Other entrants
The following players received wildcards into the singles main draw:
  Tímea Babos
  Lina Glushko
  Sandra Samir
  Rebecca Šramková

The following players received entry into the singles main draw using protected rankings:
  Barbara Haas
  Bibiane Schoofs

The following players received entry from the qualifying draw:
  Cristina Dinu
  Anastasia Kulikova
  Peangtarn Plipuech
  Maria Timofeeva
  Kateryna Volodko
  Ekaterina Yashina
  You Xiaodi
  Anastasia Zolotareva

References

External links
 2022 Al Habtoor Tennis Challenge at ITFtennis.com
 Official website

Al Habtoor Tennis Challenge
2022 ITF Women's World Tennis Tour
2022 in Emirati tennis
December 2022 sports events in the United Arab Emirates